The Scotland national netball team represents Scotland in international netball tournaments such as the Netball World Cup, the Commonwealth Games, the European Netball Championship and the Netball Singapore Nations Cup. Scotland also effectively competes in the Netball Superleague. Between 2008 and 2011 they played as Glasgow Wildcats. Since 2017 they have played as the Sirens. , Scotland was 9th in the INF World Rankings.

Tournament history

Netball World Cup
Scotland have competed in every Netball World Cup tournament, except in  2011 when they failed to qualify. The highest position they have finished is 6th which they achieved on three occasions – 1971, 1975 and 1983.

Commonwealth Games

European Netball Championship

Scotland have played regularly in the European Netball Championship. Their best performances came in 2014 and when they finished second.

Netball Singapore Nations Cup
Scotland have finished as runners up in two Netball Singapore Nations Cup tournaments.

Netball Superleague
Scotland effectively competes in the Netball Superleague. Between 2008 and 2011 they played as Glasgow Wildcats. One of the main aims of forming the Glasgow Wildcats franchise was to help Scotland prepare for the 2014 Commonwealth Games, which were hosted in Glasgow. Denise Holland was subsequently appointed joint head coach of both the Wildcats and Scotland. Since 2017 they have played as the Sirens. Gail Parata served as the joint head coach of both Sirens and Scotland. At the 2019 Netball World Cup, eleven of the Scotland squad were Sirens players.

Recent squads

2019 Netball World Cup squad

2018 Commonwealth Games squad

Head coaches

Honours
Netball Singapore Nations Cup
Runner up: 2009, 2010 
European Netball Championship
Runner up: 2014

References

 
Netball
 
National netball teams of Europe
1949 establishments in Scotland